José Gabriel Ramírez Agudelo (born September 18, 1990 in Envigado, Colombia) is a Colombian footballer currently playing for Arsenal de Sarandí of the Primera División in Argentina.

Teams
  Nueva Chicago 2011-2013
  Arsenal de Sarandí 2013–present

References
 Profile at BDFA 
 

1990 births
Living people
Colombian footballers
Colombian expatriate footballers
Nueva Chicago footballers
Arsenal de Sarandí footballers
Argentine Primera División players
Expatriate footballers in Argentina
Association football defenders
People from Envigado
Sportspeople from Antioquia Department